Octoknema orientalis is a species of plant in the family Olacaceae. It is endemic to Tanzania.

References

Flora of Tanzania
Olacaceae
Vulnerable plants
Endemic flora of Tanzania
Taxonomy articles created by Polbot